Glenn Dee Hubbard (born September 25, 1957) is an American professional baseball player and coach. He played in Major League Baseball (MLB) as a second baseman for the Atlanta Braves and Oakland Athletics from 1978 to 1989. He was a MLB All-Star in 1983. Hubbard coached for the Braves from 1999 to 2010.

Playing career
Hubbard attended Wheatland High School, just outside Beale AFB, California, where his father was stationed. He finished high school at Ben Lomond High School when his father moved to Hill Air Force Base near Ogden, Utah. Out of high school, he was a 20th round selection in the 1975 MLB draft. The Braves promoted him to the major leagues in 1978. Hubbard hit his first major league home run on September 23, .

In 1983, Hubbard had his best season; he hit .263 with 14 home runs and 70 runs batted in (RBIs) as he earned his only All-Star Game appearance.  During his 7th inning at-bat, announcers Vin Scully and Joe Garagiola made numerous light-hearted comments,even calling him Old Mother Hubbard,about his full beard, as beards were not in fashion at the time. Hubbard got a single when he hit a hard grounder to another first-time All-Star, Cal Ripken. The ball took a wicked hop that Ripken couldn't handle.

Hubbard was known more for his fielding than his hitting. His willingness to stand in while turning a double play with a runner coming at him and his steady glove made him very valuable for the Braves. He holds Braves' team fielding records for second basemen in all categories. He was also an excellent bunter and in 1982 he led the National League in sacrifice hits.

Hubbard's most notable trading card is the 1984 Fleer version in which he has an eight-foot boa constrictor draped around his neck.

Hubbard's career with the Braves lasted from 1978 to 1987. Hubbard signed as a free agent with the Oakland Athletics and played with them in 1988 and 1989.

In 1,354 games over 12 seasons, Hubbard posted a .244 batting average (1084-for-4441) with 545 runs, 214 doubles, 22 triples, 70 home runs, 448 RBIs, 35 stolen bases, and 539 bases on balls. He recorded a .983 fielding percentage; on defense, he appeared only at second base. In seven postseason games, he hit .238 (5-for-21) with three runs, one RBI and one walk.

Coaching career
Hubbard was the Braves' first base coach from 1999 to 2010 under manager Bobby Cox. When Fredi Gonzalez was hired as the Braves manager on October 13, 2010, Hubbard was not offered a position on his staff. The previous hitting coach, Terry Pendleton, replaced him.

The Kansas City Royals organization hired Hubbard in 2011. As of the 2015 season Hubbard is now bench coach for the Lexington Legends who operate as the Royals class A team. On June 24, 2016, the Legends held a promotional giveaway with a Glenn Hubbard bobblehead featuring him in a Legends uniform with a boa constrictor draped across his neck, an image made popular by his  Fleer baseball card.

References

External links
, or Retrosheet, or Pelota Binaria (Venezuelan Winter League)

1957 births
Living people
Atlanta Braves coaches
Atlanta Braves players
Cardenales de Lara players
American expatriate baseball players in Venezuela
Greenwood Braves players
Kingsport Braves players
Major League Baseball first base coaches
Major League Baseball players from Germany
Major League Baseball second basemen
Minor league baseball coaches
National League All-Stars
Oakland Athletics players
Richmond Braves players
Savannah Braves players